Kishor Pandurang Belekar is an Indian film director in Bollywood and Marathi cinema who is best known for his 2013 film Yeda.

Filmography

References

External links
 

1975 births
Living people
Indian film directors